Live in Hollywood, is a live album by saxophonist Warne Marsh recorded in 1952 and originally released on the Xanadu label in 1979.

Reception 

The Penguin Guide to Jazz states "If the Live in Hollywood sessions belie Marsh's reputation as a cool, even cold, player, that is largely Hawes's doing. He consistently pushes the pace ".
The Allmusic review noted: "This privately recorded club appearance (from the Haig in Los Angeles) features the vastly underrated tenor-saxophonist Warne Marsh in excellent form. ... Since Warne Marsh was sparsely recorded during this era, this is a valuable document of his playing".

Track listing 
 "Fine and Dandy" (Kay Swift, Paul James) – 7:12
 "You Go to My Head" (J. Fred Coots, Haven Gillespie) – 8:50
 "I Can't Believe That You're in Love with Me" (Jimmy McHugh, Clarence Gaskill) – 9:45
 "Buzzy" (Charlie Parker) – 7:15
 "All the Things You Are" (Jerome Kern, Oscar Hammerstein II) – 5:19
 "I'll Remember April" (Gene de Paul, Patricia Johnston, Don Raye) – 7:09
 "I Got Rhythm" (George Gershwin, Ira Gershwin) – 6:19

Personnel 
Warne Marsh – tenor saxophone
Hampton Hawes – piano
Joe Mondragon – bass
Shelly Manne – drums

References 

Warne Marsh live albums
1979 live albums
Xanadu Records live albums
Albums produced by Don Schlitten